UoK or UOK may refer to:
University of Kansas, USA
University of Karachi, Pakistan
University of Kent, England
University of Kigali, Rwanda
University of Kota, India
University of Kufa, Iraq
University of Kurdistan (Iran)
University of Oklahoma